The All-American Bowl is a high school football all-star game, held annually at the Alamodome in San Antonio, Texas. Typically played in January, the All-American Bowl is played between all-star teams representing the eastern and western United States.

Seventeen All-Americans have been Heisman Trophy finalists, with over 450 later playing in the National Football League. Notable alumni include: Andrew Luck, Adrian Peterson, Odell Beckham Jr., Eric Berry, Tim Tebow, Joe Thomas, Tyron Smith, Robert Quinn, C. J. Mosley, DeMarco Murray, and Chase Young.

The All-American Bowl was previously organized by All-American Games; in 2019, the game's broadcaster NBC Sports announced that it had acquired the game and its assets.

History
It was first played on December 30, 2000 at Highlander Stadium in Dallas. In 2002, the game was moved to San Antonio.

NBC started broadcasting the All-American Bowl in 2004. As a result, the game became a platform for participating college prospects to announce a verbal commitment to their future university.

Since the game's inception, attendance has risen from 6,300 for the inaugural game in 2000 to a record 40,568 in 2017. The United States Army served as title sponsor of the game until 2017, when it announced that it would not renew its sponsorship past the 2018 edition. As of 2019, the game is currently played as the All-American Bowl presented by American Family Insurance.

On February 25, 2019, it was announced that All-American Games had sold the game to NBC Sports Group for an undisclosed "seven-figure" amount. There were plans to leverage NBC's other platforms, including NBCSN, and SportsEngine (a provider of digital media services oriented towards youth and amateur sports) as part of promotion and coverage of the game. This purchase did not include other events owned by All-American Games, such as the FBU National Championships (a youth football event) and the FBU Freshman All-American Bowl – both held annually in Naples, Florida, which were sold separately to All-American Games vice-president Steve Quinn and partner Erik Richards.

The 2021 game (originally scheduled for January 9, 2021) was canceled due to the COVID-19 pandemic. In place of the game, NBC scheduled an All-American Bowl: Declaration Day special on January 2, 2021, to honor top players of the 2020 season and air commitment announcements.

Awards

During the week of the game, a number of national awards are given out at a formal awards dinner, which include:
 Ken Hall Trophy: Awarded to the nation's best high school football player. This award is named after Ken "Sugarland Express" Hall, once the all-time leading rusher in high-school football history for more than five decades.
 Bill Yoast Trophy: Awarded to the nation's top high school coach.
 Glenn Davis Army Award (West) and Doc Blanchard (East) Awards:  Recognizes an East and West player who best epitomizes the Army's high standard of excellence in community service, education, and athletic distinction.
 Anthony Muñoz Lineman of the Year Award: Awarded to the nation's best high school offensive lineman or defensive lineman.

Following the conclusion of the game on Saturday afternoon, the following awards are given out:
 Herman Boone Trophy: Awarded annually to the winning team.
 Pete Dawkins MVP Trophy
 National Coach of the Year

Selection process
All-American Bowl players are chosen through a national "selection tour" and associated combine.

Game records

Game results
East victories are shaded ██ red. West victories shaded ██ gold.

Game MVPs
A game MVP is announced following each year's All-American Bowl. In the past, the winner of the MVP award was given the Pete Dawkins Trophy, named for 1958 Heisman Trophy winner Pete Dawkins, but as of 2019 this award name is no longer active.

Notable participants
2001

East
 Chauncey Davis – Florida State
 Jason Davis - Illinois
 Trai Essex - Northwestern
 Patrick Estes - Virginia
 Dustin Fox - Ohio State
 Anttaj Hawthorne - Wisconsin
 Marlin Jackson - Michigan
 Kevin Jones - Virginia Tech
 Craphonso Thorpe - Florida State
 Leon Williams - Miami
 Pierre Woods - Michigan

West
 Lorenzo Alexander - California
 Derek Anderson - Oregon State
 Michael Clayton - LSU
 Shaun Cody - USC
 Cedric Griffin - Texas
 Tommie Harris - Oklahoma
 Derrick Johnson - Texas
 Marcus Spears - LSU
 Andrew Whitworth - LSU
 Ben Wilkerson - LSU

2002

East
 Jason Avant - Michigan
 Will Blackmon - Boston College
 Ahmad Brooks - Virginia
 Levi Brown - Penn State
 Thomas Clayton - Kansas State
 A.J. Davis - NC State
 James "Buster" Davis - Florida State
 Anthony Fasano - Notre Dame
 Nick Mangold - Ohio State
 Tyler Palko - Pittsburgh

West
 Haloti Ngata - Oregon
 Justin Blalock - Texas
 Kamerion Wimbley - Florida State
 Vince Young - Texas

2003

East
 Andre Caldwell - Florida
 Antonio Cromartie - Florida State
 Vernon Davis - Maryland
 Chris Leak - Florida
 Ryan Mundy - West Virginia
 Greg Olsen - Miami
 John Sullivan - Notre Dame
 Joe Thomas - Wisconsin
 Donte Whitner - Ohio State
 Tom Zbikowski - Notre Dame
 Shawn Crable - Michigan University

West
 Sam Baker - USC
 Tarell Brown - Texas
 Reggie Bush - USC
 John Carlson - Notre Dame
 Leon Hall - Michigan
 LenDale White - USC

2004

East
 Ryan Baker
 Connor Barth
 Tony Carter
 Dan Connor
 Ted Ginn Jr.
 Chad Henne
 Chris Long
 Zach Miller

West
 Early Doucet
 Adrian Peterson
 Matt Tuiasosopo
 Marcus Freeman

2005

East
 Brian Cushing - USC
 Rashard Mendenhall - Illini
 Zoltan Mesko
 Tony Moeaki - Iowa
 Eugene Monroe
 Michael Oher - Ole Miss
 Kenny Phillips

West
 Travis Beckum
 Martellus Bennett
 Jamaal Charles - Texas
 DeSean Jackson - California
 Rey Maualuga - USC
 David Nelson
 Mark Sanchez - USC
 Jonathan Stewart
 Ndamukong Suh - Nebraska

2006

East
 Matt Bosher - Miami
 Brandon Graham - Michigan
 Percy Harvin - Florida
 LeSean McCoy - Pittsburgh
 Jared Odrick - Penn State
 Myron Rolle - Florida State
 Andre Smith - Alabama
 Brandon Spikes - Florida
 C. J. Spiller - Clemson
 Tim Tebow - Florida

West
 Perrish Cox - Oklahoma State
 Kai Forbath - UCLA
 Michael Goodson - Texas A&M
 Sergio Kindle - Texas
 Taylor Mays - USC
 Gerald McCoy - Oklahoma
 DeMarco Murray - Oklahoma
 J'Marcus Webb - Texas

2007

East
 Arrelious Benn - Illinois
 Noel Devine - West Virginia
 Eric Berry - Tennessee
 Anthony Davis - Rutgers
 Marcus Gilchrist - Clemson
 MarQueis Gray - Minnesota
 Greg Little - North Carolina
 Stefen Wisniewski - Penn State
 Major Wright - Florida

West
 John Clay - Wisconsin
 Everson Griffen - USC
 Ryan Mallett - Michigan
 Joe McKnight - USC
 Marc Tyler - USC
 Jimmy Clausen - Notre Dame
 Chris Galippo - USCSource:

2008

East
 Nigel Bradham - Florida State
 Arthur Brown - Miami
 Quinton Coples - North Carolina
 Kyle Long - Oregon
 Patrick Peterson - LSU
 Terrelle Pryor - Ohio State
 Robert Quinn - North Carolina
 Kyle Rudolph - Notre Dame
 Blair Walsh - Georgia

West
 Michael Floyd - Notre Dame
 Matt Kalil - USC
 Jermaine Kearse - Washington
 Andrew Luck - Stanford
 Michael Mauti - Penn State
 Rahim Moore - UCLA
 Nick Perry - USC
 Tyron Smith - USC
 Justin Tucker - TexasSource:

2009

East
 Jonathan Bostic - Florida
 Bryce Brown - Tennessee
 Tajh Boyd - Clemson
 Orson Charles - Georgia
 Jarvis Jones - Georgia
 Morgan Moses - Virginia
 Zeke Motta - Notre Dame
 Aaron Murray - Georgia
 John Simon - Ohio State
 Shayne Skov - Stanford
 Logan Thomas - Virginia Tech

West
 Vontaze Burfict - Arizona State
 D. J. Fluker - Alabama
 Nico Johnson - Alabama
 Devon Kennard - USC
 Dre Kirkpatrick - Alabama
 A. J. McCarron - Alabama
 T. J. McDonald - USC
 Christine Michael - Texas A&M
 Barkevious Mingo - LSU
 Rueben Randle - LSU
 Sheldon Richardson - MissouriSources:

2010

East
 Keenan Allen - California
 Martavis Bryant - Clemson
 Matt Elam - Florida
 Ego Ferguson - LSU
 Sharrif Floyd - Florida
 Marcus Lattimore - South Carolina
 Kelcy Quarles - South Carolina
 Silas Redd - Penn State
 Spencer Ware - LSU
 Jaylen Watkins - Florida

West
 Anthony Barr - UCLA
 Ahmad Dixon - Baylor
 Marquis Flowers - Arizona
 Jackson Jeffcoat - Texas
 Tony Jefferson - Oklahoma
 Jake Matthews - Texas A&M
 C.J. Mosley - Alabama
 Ronald Powell - Florida
 Eric Reid - LSU
 Lache Seastrunk - Oregon
 Robert Woods - USCSources:

2011

East
 Teddy Bridgewater - Louisville
 Timmy Jernigan - Florida State
 Nick O'Leary - Florida State
 Stephon Tuitt - Notre Dame
 Charone Peake - Clemson
 Sammy Watkins - Clemson
 Ray Drew - Missouri
 Curtis Grant - Ohio State
 Tony Steward - Clemson
 James Wilder Jr. - Florida State

West
 Odell Beckham Jr. - LSU
 Malcolm Brown - Texas
 Kenny Hilliard - LSU
 Trey Metoyer - Oklahoma
 Jaxon Shipley - Texas
 Cody Kessler - USC
 Austin Seferian-Jenkins - Washington
 De'Anthony Thomas - OregonSource:

2012

East
 Deon Bush - Miami
 Stefon Diggs - Maryland
 Eli Harold - Virginia
 Tracy Howard - Miami
 Jonathan Bullard - Florida
 D. J. Humphries - Florida

West
 Arik Armstead - Oregon
 Dorial Green-Beckham - Missouri
 Byron Marshall - Oregon
 Ellis McCarthy - UCLA
 Cyler Miles - Washington
 Jordan Payton - UCLA
 KeiVarae Russell - Notre Dame
 Barry J. Sanders - Stanford
 Kevon Seymour - USC
 Shaq Thompson - Washington
 Max Tuerk - USC
 Trey Williams -Texas A&M
 T.J. Yeldon - AlabamaSources:

2013

East
 Mackensie Alexander - Clemson
 Jonathan Allen - Alabama
 Eli Apple - Ohio State
 Tyler Boyd - Pittsburgh
 Jake Butt - Michigan
 Kendall Fuller - Virginia Tech
 Derrick Henry - Alabama
 Jalen Ramsey - Florida State
 Laremy Tunsil - Ole Miss

West
 Max Browne - USC
 Su'a Cravens - USC
 Ezekiel Elliott - Ohio State
 Myles Jack - UCLA
 A'Shawn Robinson - Alabama
 Jaylon Smith - Notre Dame
 Thomas Tyner - Oregon
 Eddie Vanderdoes - UCLA
 Tre'Davious White - LSUSource:

2014

East
 Nick Chubb - Georgia
 Elijah Hood - North Carolina
 Jalen Hurd - Tennessee
 Sony Michel - Georgia
 Curtis Samuel - Ohio State
 Artavis Scott - Clemson
 Mason Cole - Michigan
 Rodrigo Blankenship - Georgia

West
 Budda Baker - Washington
 KD Cannon - Baylor
 Royce Freeman - Oregon
 Jerrod Heard - Texas
 Allen Lazard - Iowa State
 Christian McCaffrey - Stanford
 Malik McDowell - Michigan State
 Joe Mixon - OklahomaSource:

2015

East
 Trenton Thompson - Georgia
 Sam Darnold - USC
 Mitch Hyatt - Clemson
 Martez Ivey - Florida

West
 Derrius Guice - LSU Tigers
 Alizé Jones - Notre DameSource:

2016

East
 Derrick Brown - Auburn
 Brian Burns - Florida State
 Bryan Edwards - South Carolina
 Jacob Eason - Georgia
 Mecole Hardman - Georgia
 Dexter Lawrence - Clemson
 DK Metcalf - Ole Miss
 Trayvon Mullen - Clemson

West
 Ross Blacklock - TCU
 Justin Madubuike - Texas A&M
 Byron Murphy - Washington
 Shea Patterson - Ole Miss
 Michael Pittman Jr. - USC
 Jeffery Simmons - Mississippi State
 Devin Asiasi - MichiganSource:

2017

East
 Cam Akers - Florida State
 A. J. Epenesa - Iowa
 Creed Humphrey - Oklahoma
 Cole Kmet - Notre Dame
 Henry Ruggs - Alabama
 D'Andre Swift - Georgia
 Tua Tagovailoa - Alabama
 Andrew Thomas - Georgia
 Chase Young - Ohio State

West
 J. K. Dobbins - Ohio State
 Najee Harris - Alabama
 Darnay Holmes - UCLA
 Austin Jackson - USC
 Jeff Okudah - Ohio State
 Jaelan Phillips - UCLA
 DeVonta Smith - Alabama
 Tristan Wirfs - Iowa

2018

East
 Trevor Lawrence - Clemson
 Patrick Surtain II - Alabama
 Micah Parsons - Penn State
 Zamir White - Georgia
 Tyson Campbell - Georgia
 Jackson Carman - Clemson 
 Phil Jurkovec - Notre Dame, Boston College

West
 Penei Sewell - Oregon
 Jaylen Waddle - Alabama
 Amon-Ra St. Brown - USC
 JT Daniels - Georgia, USC
 Matt Corral - Mississippi

2019

East
 Nolan Smith - Georgia
 Graham Mertz- Wisconsin
 Sam Howell - North Carolina
 Travon Walker - Georgia
 Charles Cross - Mississippi State
 Kyle Hamilton - Notre Dame

West
 Derek Stingley - LSU
 Spencer Rattler - Oklahoma, South Carolina
 Daxton Hill - Michigan
 DeMarvin Leal - Texas A&M
 Garrett Wilson - Ohio State
 Trent McDuffie - Washington

2020

East
 Bryan Bresee - Clemson
 DJ Uiagalelei - Clemson
 Will Anderson Jr. - Alabama
 Paris Johnson Jr. - Ohio State
 Myles Murphy - Clemson
 Peter Skoronski - Northwestern

West
 Bryce Young - Alabama
 Jaxon Smith-Njigba - Ohio State
 C. J. Stroud - Ohio State
 Bijan Robinson - Texas
 Kelee Ringo - Georgia

2021Not Played''

2022

East
 Mykel Williams - Georgia
 Nicholas Singleton - Nittany Lions

West
 Cade Klubnik - Clemson
 Tetairoa McMillan - Arizona

2023

East
 Dante Moore - UCLA
 Caleb Downs - Alabama

West

Position breakdown by measurables, highest state representation

By state 
All-American Bowl selections have represented 46 states and provinces since 2010. California has the most selections all-time with 193. Florida and Texas are currently tied for the second most (178) with Georgia (149) the only other state with more than 100 selections.

† 2013 may have incomplete data on the 247sports.com roster page

‡ 2021 game cancelled due to COVID

By school 
Over 1,000 schools have had at least one player to All-American Bowl rosters and over 20% of have had more than one selection. 

Bradenton (FL) IMG Academy has the most all-time selections with 20, all coming since 2016.  The only other schools with more than 10 selections are Santa Ana (CA) Mater Dei, Bellflower (CA) St. John Bosco and Fort Lauderdale (FL) American Heritage. IMG Academy also holds the record for most selections in a single year (5) in 2018.

Schools with multiple selections in a year

Total selections

See also 

 High School Football National Championship

Notes

External links

 

High school football games in the United States
High school sports in Texas
American football competitions in San Antonio
Annual sporting events in the United States
Recurring sporting events established in 2000